Augustus Newton Martin (March 23, 1847 – July 11, 1901) was an American lawyer, educator, and veteran of the Civil War who served three terms as a U.S. Representative from Indiana from 1889 to 1895.

Biography
Born near Whitestown, Connoquenessing Township, Pennsylvania, Martin attended the common schools and Witherspoon Institute, Butler, Pennsylvania, and graduated in February 1867 from Eastman Business College in Poughkeepsie, New York.

Civil War 
On July 3, 1863, he enlisted in Company I, Fifty-eighth Regiment, Pennsylvania Volunteer Militia. He enlisted again, on February 22, 1865, in Company E, Seventy-eighth Regiment, Pennsylvania Volunteer Infantry, and served until discharged for disability August 30, 1865.

Career after the war 
After his service in the Civil War, Martin taught school. He studied law in Bluffton, Indiana, in 1869. He was admitted to the bar in 1870 and practiced. He served as a member of the Indiana House of Representatives in 1875.

Political career 
Martin was elected reporter of the Indiana Supreme Court in 1876 and served four years. He was an unsuccessful candidate for reelection in 1880. He lived in Austin, Texas from 1881 to 1883, and returned to Bluffton in 1883.

Martin was elected as a Democrat to the Fifty-first, Fifty-second, and Fifty-third Congresses (March 4, 1889 – March 3, 1895).

He served as chairman of the Committee on Invalid Pensions (Fifty-second and Fifty-third Congresses). He was an unsuccessful candidate for reelection to the Fifty-fourth Congress.

Later career and death 
He engaged in the practice of law in Bluffton until his death at the Soldiers' Home Hospital, Marion, Indiana on July 11, 1901. He was interred in Fairview Cemetery in Bluffton.

References

1847 births
1901 deaths
People of Pennsylvania in the American Civil War
Democratic Party members of the Indiana House of Representatives
Indiana lawyers
People of Indiana in the American Civil War
American militiamen
Democratic Party members of the United States House of Representatives from Indiana
People from Bluffton, Indiana
19th-century American politicians